You Gave Me a Mountain is a studio album by Frankie Laine released in 1969 on ABC Records.

It was recorded with the Jimmy Bowen Orchestra and Chorus.

Track listing

Charts

References 

1969 albums
Frankie Laine albums
ABC Records albums
Albums produced by Jimmy Bowen